Peoria is a genus of moths of the snout moth family (Pyralidae). The genus was erected by Émile Louis Ragonot in 1887.

Species
In alphabetical order:
Peoria albifasciata (Hampson, 1918)
Peoria approximella (Walker, 1866)
Peoria bipartitella Ragonot, 1887
Peoria calamistis (Hampson, 1917)
Peoria cashmiralis (Hampson, 1903)
Peoria discinotella (Ragonot)
Peoria floridella Shaffer, 1968
Peoria gaudiella (Hulst, 1890)
Peoria gemmatella (Hulst, 1887)
Peoria holoponerella (Dyar, 1908)
Peoria johnstoni Shaffer, 1968
Peoria longipalpella (Ragonot, 1887)
Peoria luteicostella (Ragonot, 1887)
Peoria opacella (Hulst, 1887)
Peoria padreella Blanchard, 1981
Peoria punctata Shaffer, 1976
Peoria punctilineella (Hampson, 1901)
Peoria roseotinctella (Ragonot, 1887)
Peoria rosinella (Hampson, 1918)
Peoria rostrella (Ragonot, 1887)
Peoria santaritella (Dyar, 1904)
Peoria tetradella (Zeller, 1872)

Footnotes

References

Pyralidae genera
Anerastiini
Taxa named by Émile Louis Ragonot